Homopolysaccharides are polysaccharides  composed of a single type of sugar monomer. For example, cellulose is an unbranched homopolysaccharide made up of glucose monomers connected via beta-glycosidic linkages; glycogen is a branched form, where the glucose monomers are joined by alpha-glycosidic linkages. Depending upon the molecules attached that are of the following types 
1. Glucan - A polysaccharide of glucose 
2. Fructan - A polysaccharide of fructose 
3. Galactan - A polysaccharide of galactose
4. Araban - A polysaccharide of arabinose
5. Xylan - A polysaccharide of xylose

References

Polysaccharides